Bezirk Wolfsberg is a district of the state of 
Carinthia in Austria.

Municipalities
Towns (Städte) are indicated in boldface; market towns (Marktgemeinden) in italics; suburbs, hamlets and other subdivisions of a municipality are indicated in small characters.
Bad Sankt Leonhard im Lavanttal
Bad St. Leonhard im Lavanttal, Erzberg, Görlitzen, Gräbern, Gräbern, Kalchberg, Kliening, Lichtengraben, Mauterndorf, Prebl, Raning, Schiefling, Schönberg, Steinbruch, Twimberg, Wartkogel, Wiesenau, Wisperndorf
Frantschach-Sankt Gertraud
Frantschach, Hintergumitsch, Hinterwölch, Kaltstuben, Kamp, Kamperkogel, Limberg, Obergösel, Praken, St. Gertraud, Trum-und Prössinggraben, Untergösel, Vorderlimberg, Vorderwölch, Zellach
Lavamünd
Achalm, Ettendorf, Hart, Krottendorf, Lamprechtsberg, Lavamünd, Lorenzenberg, Magdalensberg, Pfarrdorf, Plestätten, Rabenstein, Rabensteingreuth, Schwarzenbach, St. Vinzenz, Unterbergen, Unterholz, Weißenberg, Witternig, Wunderstätten, Zeil
Reichenfels
Reichenfels, Sommerau, St. Peter im Lavanttal, Weitenbach
Preitenegg
Kleinpreitenegg, Oberauerling, Oberpreitenegg, Preitenegg, Unterauerling, Unterpreitenegg
Sankt Andrä
Aich, Blaiken, Burgstall-Pölling, Burgstall-St. Andrä, Dachberg, Eisdorf, Eitweg, Farrach, Fischering, Framrach, Gemmersdorf, Goding, Gönitz, Hainsdorf, Höfern, Jakling, Kienberg, Kleinedling, Kleinrojach, Kollegg, Lamm, Langegg, Langgen, Lindhof, Magersdorf, Maria Rojach, Messensach, Mettersdorf, Mitterpichling, Mosern, Mühldorf, Oberagsdorf, Oberaigen, Obereberndorf, Oberpichling, Paierdorf, Pichling, Pirk, Pölling, Pustritz, Ragglach, Ragglbach, Reisberg, Schaßbach, Schobersberg, Schönweg-Pustritz, Schönweg-St. Andrä, Siebending, St. Andrä, St. Jakob, St. Ulrich, Streitberg, Tschrietes, Unteragsdorf, Unteraigen, Untereberndorf, Unterrain, Völking, Wimpassing, Winkling-Nord, Winkling-Süd, Wölzing-Fischering, Wölzing-St. Andrä, Zellbach
Sankt Georgen im Lavanttal
Allersdorf, Andersdorf, Fransdorf, Götzendorf, Gundisch, Herzogberg, Krakaberg, Matschenbloch, Niederhof, Oberrainz, Pfaffendorf, Pontnig, Raggane, St. Georgen im Lavanttal, Steinberg-Hart, Steinberg-Oberhaus, Steinberg-Unterhaus, Unterpichling, Unterpichling, Unterrainz
Sankt Paul im Lavanttal
Deutsch-Grutschen, Gönitz, Granitztal-St. Paul, Granitztal-Weißenegg, Hundsdorf, Johannesberg, Kampach, Kollnitzgreuth, Legerbuch, Loschental, Schildberg, St. Margarethen, St. Martin, St. Paul im Lavanttal, Stadling, Unterhaus, Unterholz, Weinberg, Windisch-Grutschen, Winkling, Zellbach
Wolfsberg
Aichberg, Altendorf, Arling, Auen, Eselsdorf, Forst, Glein, Gräbern, Gries, Großedling, Hartelsberg, Hartneidstein, Hattendorf, Hintertheißenegg, Kleinedling, Kleinwinklern, Klippitztörl, Kötsch, Kragelsdorf, Lading, Lausing, Leiwald, Magersdorf, Maildorf, Michaelsdorf, Oberleidenberg, Paildorf, Pfaffendorf, Pollheim, Prebl, Preims, Priel, Raggl, Reding, Reideben, Reinfelsdorf, Reisberg, Rieding, Riegelsdorf, Ritzing, Schilting, Schleifen, Schoßbach, Schwemmtratten, Siegelsdorf, St. Jakob, St. Johann, St. Marein, St. Margarethen im Lavanttal, St. Michael, St. Stefan, St. Thomas, Thürn, Unterleidenberg, Völking, Vordergumitsch, Vordertheißenegg, Waldenstein, Weißenbach Gumitsch, Weißenbach Rieding, Witra, Wois, Wolfsberg, Wolkersdorf, Wölling

 
Districts of Carinthia (state)